For people with the surname, see Fallis (surname).

Fallis is a town in Lincoln County, Oklahoma, United States. The population was 27 at the 2010 census, a decline of 3.6 percent from the figure of 28 in 2000.

Geography
Fallis is located at  (35.749471, -97.121665).  Located in western Lincoln County, Fallis is situated on a paved county road five miles northwest of Wellston.

History
Fallis was founded in 1892, just south of an Indian village on the western edge of the Iowa Reservation, in a wooded area and "on a long red hill."  Originally named Mission 1892–1894, it was renamed in 1894 for its prime developer and first postmaster, Judge William Henry Fallis.  Although the town is mostly abandoned today, and is nearly a ghost town, during the early 1900s Fallis was a whistle-stop for several railroad lines, and was a thriving little community with stores, hotels, banks, lumber yards, and other businesses, as well as a city hall.  The population may have reached 400 during this time.  Fallis was the home of several accomplished authors and poets.

After the Great Depression, the Dust Bowl, and the decline of the railroad, by 1950 the population had fallen to just 105 residents, and much of the town was destroyed by fire in 1960.  Very little of the old town was ever rebuilt, and only a handful of buildings remain.

However, Fallis still maintains a volunteer firestation, and a community center was built in 1999.

Demographics

As of the census of 2000, there were 28 people, 13 households, and 7 families residing in the town. There were 17 housing units at an average density of 49.3 per square mile (19.3/km2). The racial makeup of the town was 92.86% White and 7.14% African American.

There were 13 households, out of which 23.1% had children under the age of 18 living with them, 53.8% were married couples living together, 7.7% had a female householder with no husband present, and 38.5% were non-families. 38.5% of all households were made up of individuals, and 30.8% had someone living alone who was 65 years of age or older. The average household size was 2.15 and the average family size was 2.88.

In the town, the population was spread out, with 17.9% under the age of 18, 17.9% from 18 to 24, 25.0% from 25 to 44, 17.9% from 45 to 64, and 21.4% who were 65 years of age or older. The median age was 32 years. For every 100 females, there were 100.0 males. For every 100 females age 18 and over, there were 130.0 males.

The median income for a household in the town was $41,875, and the median income for a family was $51,250. Males had a median income of $27,083 versus $0 for females. The per capita income for the town was $12,869. There were no families and 6.9% of the population living below the poverty line, including no under eighteens and 50.0% of those over 64.

References

External links
 Encyclopedia of Oklahoma History and Culture - Fallis
 Oklahoma Digital Maps: Digital Collections of Oklahoma and Indian Territory

Oklahoma City metropolitan area
Towns in Lincoln County, Oklahoma
Towns in Oklahoma